The Wildest Wish to Fly is a solo album by Rupert Hine.  It was originally released in 1983 on A&M Records and Island Records and re-released on CD in 2001 on VoicePrint. The album peaked at #31 on the Swedish album chart.

Track listing
All tracks composed by Rupert Hine

"No Yellow Heart" (Original Version)
"Living in Sin"
"The Saturation of the Video Rat"
"Firefly in the Night"
"A Golden Age"
"Picture-phone"
"Victim of Wanderlust"
"The Most Dangerous of Men"
"The Wildest Wish to Fly"
"Blue Flame (Melt the Ice)" (Bonus CD track)
"No Yellow Heart" (Later Version) (Bonus CD track)

Personnel
Includes liner notes by Rupert Hine
Rupert Hine - vocals, various instruments
Robert Palmer - vocals on "Living in Sin"
Phil Palmer - guitar
James West-Oram (member of The Fixx) - guitar
Stephen W Tayler - woodwinds, recording and mixing
Michael Dawe - drums

References 

1983 albums
Rupert Hine albums
Albums produced by Rupert Hine
A&M Records albums